The Walu were an indigenous Australian people of the Gulf of Carpentaria in the Northern Territory.

Country

People
Little is known of the Walu, since the only report Tindale could find was an article by W. G. Stretton dating back to 1893. Stretton, a long-time special magistrate at Borroloola writes of them in lurid terms.  Recent research has begun to question both Stretton's paper, and Tindale's use of it in order to claim that the Vanderlin people were an independent tribe, as opposed to being a branch of the Yanyuwa. The modern Yanyuwa do not recognize this term in European ethnography as either a language name or ethnonym, and have suggested that it may be a distortion of a Yanyuwa term allu, signifying 'them/those others'.

History of contact
Stretton thought the physical features of the Walu and surrounding tribes showed the impact of their trade and intercourse with Malayan traders. Sites with traces of the presence of Makassar traders are attested on the island. At the time of Stretton's writing, he numbered the tribe, which he called the Leewalloo at some 130 persons.

Alternative names
 Walloo.
 Leewalloo.

Notes

Citations

Sources

Aboriginal peoples of the Northern Territory